The Spirit River Formation is a stratigraphical unit of middle Albian age in the Western Canadian Sedimentary Basin.

It takes the name from the Spirit River, and was first described in Imperial Oil Spirit River No. 1 well by Badgley in 1952.

Lithology
The Spirit River Formation consists, from bottom to top of fine to medium grained argillaceous sandstone, dark shale, ironstone, greywacke, shale, siltstone, coal and dark shale with thin sandstone and siltstone stringers.

Hydrocarbon production

Gas is produced from channels developed in the Falher Member in northern Alberta.

Hydraulic fracturing in Canada

'Massive' hydraulic fracturing has been widely used in Alberta since the late 1970s to recover gas from low-permeability sandstones of the Spirit River Formation. Massive hydraulic fracturing has been widely used in Alberta since the late 1970s. The method is currently used in development of the Cardium, Duvernay, Montney and Viking formations in Alberta, Bakken formation in Saskatchewan, Montney and Horn River formations in British Columbia.

Distribution
It is found in the sub-surface in the Peace River Country, in an area stretching from Fort St. John, British Columbia to the Lesser Slave Lake from west to east, and from Grande Prairie, Alberta to Manning, Alberta from south to north.

Relationship to other units

The  Spirit River Formation is conformably overlain by the Peace River Formation and conformably underlain by the Bluesky Formation. It grades laterally to the Buckinghorse Formation shales to the north-east, and into the sandy facies of the Malcolm Creek Formation south of the Wapiti River. It is equivalent to the upper Mannville Formation in Central Alberta and to the Clearwater Formation and Grand Rapids Formation in the upper Athabasca River area.

Subdivisions

The  Spirit River Formation is composed of the following sub-divisions from base to top:

References

Stratigraphy of Alberta
Stratigraphy of British Columbia